Cairo Declaration is a 2015 Chinese 2D historical film directed by Wen Deguang and Hu Minggang and written by Liu Xing. The film stars Hu Jun, Cecilia Han, Ma Xiaowei, and Tang Guoqiang. The film was scheduled to be released on September 3, 2015.

The film was promoted by the August First Film Studio to mark the 70th anniversary of the victory of the Second Sino-Japanese War.

Cast
 Isabella Charlton Zhōuxiǎolín as Mary Churchill.
 Hu Jun as Shi Jianfeng, a password cracking expert.
 Cecilia Han as Edo Eiko, Shi Jianfeng's wife.
 Carina Lau as Soong Mei-ling, first lady of the Republic of China, Chiang Kai-shek's wife.
 Joan Chen as Soong Ching-ling, Sun Yat-sen's wife, Honorary President of the People's Republic of China.
 Yu Zifei as Soong Ai-ling, H. H. Kung's wife.
 Ma Xiaowei as Chiang Kai-shek, Chairman of the Nationalist government.
 Tang Guoqiang as Mao Zedong, Chairman of the Communist Party of China, and author of Little Red Book.
 Daniel Krauser as Sorge, a Soviet intelligence personnel.
 Darren Grosvenor as Alexander Comstock Kirk, an American Ambassador.
 Yao Di as Huang Yiqing, an undercover of the Chinese Communist Party.
 He Zhengjun as He Yingqin, Commander in chief of the National Revolutionary Army.

Production
The principal photography on the film began on March 9, 2015, in Liangjiang International Cinema of Chongqing city.

The film was shot on locations in Chongqing, Shanghai, Tianjin and Beijing.

Criticism 
The distributors issued four posters, Mao Zedong, Winston Churchill, Franklin Roosevelt, and Joseph Stalin. Chinese internet users have questioned the move of featuring Mao, instead of Chiang Kai-shek, Generalissimo of the Republic of China, in the poster, since Chiang was present at the Cairo Conference, but Mao was not.

Release
Theatrical release will be on September 3, 2015.

Awards and nominations

References

External links
 
 
 

2010s Mandarin-language films
2010s historical drama films
Chinese historical drama films
Second Sino-Japanese War films
2010s Japanese-language films
Films shot in Chongqing
Films shot in Shanghai
Films shot in Beijing
Films set in China
Cultural depictions of Mao Zedong
Cultural depictions of Chiang Kai-shek
Films set in the 1940s
2015 drama films
2015 films
2010s English-language films
2015 multilingual films
Chinese multilingual films